Anaïs Sabatini (born 1990) is a French lawyer and politician from National Rally (RN) who has represented the 2nd constituency of Pyrénées-Orientales in the National Assembly since 2022.

Sabatini was born in Perpignan in 1990. She studied for a law degree and practices as a lawyer in family law and children's rights. She was previously a member of the youth wing for the Union for a Popular Movement and then Les Républicains Les Jeunes Républicains but left the party in 2019. Later that year she was elected as a municipal councilor for the National Rally in Perpignan.

See also 

 List of deputies of the 16th National Assembly of France

References 

1990 births
Living people
Deputies of the 16th National Assembly of the French Fifth Republic
21st-century French politicians
21st-century French women politicians
National Rally (France) politicians
Women members of the National Assembly (France)
Members of Parliament for Pyrénées-Orientales